Obrium xanthum is a species of beetle in the family Cerambycidae. It was described by Hovore and Chemsak in 1980.

References

Obriini
Beetles described in 1980